National Tertiary Route 807, or just Route 807 (or ) is a National Road Route of Costa Rica, located in the Limón province.

Description
In Limón province the route covers Matina canton (Carrandi district).

References

Highways in Costa Rica